Der Teufelskreis is an East German film about the Reichstag fire trial. It was released in 1956.

External links
 

1956 films
1950s historical films
German historical films
East German films
1950s German-language films
Films directed by Carl Balhaus
Films set in Berlin
Films set in 1933
Films set in 1934
1950s German films
German black-and-white films